South Shields railway station was the main railway station for South Shields, in Tyne and Wear, North-East England. The station was located on Mile End Road in the town centre. The station was opened by the NER in 1879 as the terminus of their newly extended Newcastle and South Shields Railway branch from Pelaw via Hebburn and had two platforms and an ornate overall roof.

The town had been rail-served by some years prior to this - the Stanhope and Tyne Railway had opened their route from Washington back in 1834, whilst the Brandling Junction Railway followed with a branch from  five years later. Both these companies (and the S&T's successor the Pontop and South Shields Railway) had though been purely concerned with mineral traffic and passenger provision was limited.

The 1923 Grouping saw the station pass from the NER into the control of the London and North Eastern Railway.  Services on both routes remained well used and in 1938, the line from Newcastle was electrified on the 660 V DC system as an extension of the existing North Tyneside suburban network.

Nationalisation in 1948 saw the station become part of British Railways North Eastern Region, but over the next few years services began to decline - those to Whitburn Colliery ended in November 1953, whilst the direct Sunderland trains fell victim to the Beeching Axe in May 1965 (passengers thereafter having to change at Pelaw).  The Newcastle line was also converted to diesel multiple unit operation in 1963, with BR stating that it was cheaper to remove the third rail than renew the electrical equipment on the route. Though it survived the Beeching cuts, by the 1970s the station (and route) had become increasingly run down and so it was a logical choice to be included in the planned Tyne & Wear Metro network.

It was eventually closed on 1 June 1981, when the line was temporarily shut down for conversion to Metro operation.  It was replaced by a new South Shields Metro station a short distance to the south, when the line reopened in 1984. The station building survived as an entrance to the Metro system until the 1990s, when it was demolished.

Today, a Shopmobility centre stands on the site of the original station building. The new building was built to a similar style as the station it replaced.  The platforms behind have been removed, but the rest of the site is still used by Metro as carriage & engineers' sidings.

In early 2019 a new interchange opened there which is also a bus terminal. The same tracks are used but the platform has moved.

References

External links
 RAILSCOT - South Shields

Disused railway stations in Tyne and Wear
Railway stations in Great Britain opened in 1879
Railway stations in Great Britain closed in 1981
Former North Eastern Railway (UK) stations
1879 establishments in England
1981 disestablishments in England
Transport in South Shields